Graines de star was a French television talent show created  by Thierry Ardisson, presented by Laurent Boyer and broadcast on the French TV channel M6 on Friday evenings at 8:50 pm between February 1996 and March 2003.

Notable performers who appeared on the show have included Alizée and Willy Denzey.

1996 French television series debuts
2003 French television series endings